Glushakov is a Russian surname that may refer to:

 Denis Glushakov (born 1987), Russian footballer
 Valeri Glushakov (born 1926), Soviet and Belarusian opera singer
 Valeri Glushakov (born 1959), Soviet and Russian footballer

Russian-language surnames